Bangsamoro Youth Model Parliamentarian Association (also BYMPA), is a youth organization composed of youth leaders from the different religions and tribes in the Bangsamoro Autonomous Region in the Philippines, simulating parliamentary proceedings of a legislature or other deliberative assembly. It was formed on September 21, 2018 the same time they proposed bills through the office of Regional Legislative Assembly – Autonomous Region in Muslim Mindanao led by the Office of the Presidential Advisers on the Peace Process.  The organization was established during the three-day summit "MasterPeace: Bangsamoro Youth Model Parliament" to build a culture of peace in the Bangsamoro region in discussing critical issues for a peace-building community as they crafted and deliberated on proposed bills for the Bangsamoro Autonomous Region in Muslim Mindanao, co-organized by the Democratic Leadership and Active Civil Society Empowerment (DELACSE) Bangsamoro, a European Union-funded project implemented by Konrad-Adenauer-Stiftung Philippines, and the Institute for Autonomy and Governance.

Bangsamoro Transition 
On June 19, 2019, BYMPA joined the policy making during the transition of Bangsamoro Autonomous Region in crafting of five-point youth peace and security agenda.

See also 
Bangsamoro Assembly

References

Politics of Bangsamoro
History of Bangsamoro